The Escalante River is a river of Venezuela. It drains into Lake Maracaibo.

The river rises in the Venezuelan Andes.
It then flows through the Maracaibo dry forests ecoregion before emptying into Lake Maracaibo.

See also
List of rivers of Venezuela

References

Rivers of Venezuela